Tomáš Rada (born 28 September 1983) is a Czech footballer, who currently plays for FK Meteor Prague VIII as a centre back.

He also played for the Czech youth national teams since the under-15 level.

Career
After having played for FC Viktoria Plzeň, he signed a three-and-a-half year contract with Sivasspor in January 2011.

Honours

Club

 FC Viktoria Plzeň
 Czech Cup: 2010

References

External links 
 
 
 Guardian Stats Centre
 
 

1983 births
Czech footballers
Czech expatriate footballers
FK Baník Most players
AC Sparta Prague players
FC Viktoria Plzeň players
FC Vysočina Jihlava players
Sivasspor footballers
1. FC Slovácko players
Loko Vltavín players
Czech First League players
Süper Lig players
Living people
Association football defenders
Czech expatriate sportspeople in Turkey
Expatriate footballers in Turkey
Footballers from Prague